Lélé may refer to:

Places 
 Lélé River, a river in Cameroon
 Lélé, Cameroon, a town in southern Cameroon

Other uses 
 Lélé language, spoken in the Sanguié Province of Burkina Faso